Etka Gorgan was an Iranian football club based in Gorgan, Iran.

History
Etka Gorgan was founded in 2008 and was placed in the Azadegan League. Etka had several mid table finishes until the 2012-2013 season, where they finished 11th and were relegated to the 2nd Division. Etka only played in the 2nd Division for one year as they were immediately promoted back to the Azadegan League. The club faced financial problems and dropped out of the Azadegan League in 2015.

Season-by-season
The table below chronicles the achievements of Etka Gorgan in various competitions since 2008.

Club managers
 Ali Nikhbakht (July 2008-Nov 08)
 Saket Elhami (Nov 2008-Jan 09)
 Hadi Bargizar (Jan 2009-July 10)
 Hossein Ghezelsafloo (July 2010-?)
 Hamid Kolalifard (2011-2012)
 Saket Elhami (2012-Nov 12)
 Hamid Kolalifard (Nov 2012-)

Famous players

  Sardar Azmoun (youth teams)
  Mohammad Al Khegani (youth teams)
  Armin Vaghei (youth teams)

References

External links
     Official Website
   Official Blog
  Etka Players and Results 
   Fans Blog

Association football clubs established in 2008
Sport in Golestan Province
2008 establishments in Iran